The Irish records in swimming are ratified by Irelands's governing body in swimming, Swim Ireland. Records can be set in long course (50 metres) or short course (25 metres) swimming pools, with records currently recorded in the following events for both men and women.
Freestyle: 50 m, 100 m, 200 m, 400 m, 800 m, 1500 m
Backstroke: 50 m, 100 m, 200 m
Breaststroke: 50 m, 100 m, 200 m
Butterfly: 50 m, 100 m, 200 m
Individual medley: 100 m (short course only), 200 m, 400 m
Relays: 4×50 m freestyle (short course only), 4 × 100 m freestyle, 4 × 200 m freestyle, 4×50 m freestyle (short course only), 4 × 100 m medley

Long course (50 m)

Men

Women

Mixed relay

Short course (25 m)

Men

Women

Mixed relay

Notes

References
General
Irish Long Course Records 3 August 2022 updated
Irish Short Course Records 20 December 2022 updated
Irish Mixed Relay Records 20 December 2022 updated
Specific

External links
Swim Ireland
Swim Ireland records subpage

Ireland
Records
Swimming records
Swimming